Aavarana is a 2007 Kannada novel by novelist S. L. Bhyrappa. Aavarana (  meaning 'to conceal') means enveloping or covering something. This novel deals with the historical character like Mogul Emperor Aurangazeb. Aavarana was sold out even before its release in February 2007. The novel went on to create a record in the Indian literary world by witnessing 10 reprints within five months of its release.

Like most of Bhyrappa's novels, Aavarana too generated tremendous debate and discussion. Many prominent intellectuals believe Aavarana dangerously advanced the fundamentalist agenda by tilting at the windmills of history, and that it seeks to divide society on communal lines. On the other hand, the writer's original posit that the Truth needs to be told has connected with the readers that it has seen repeated reprintings.  The author has vigorously protested the tag that the book is inflammatory by challenging the reviewers to refute the points made in the book.  It is also pertinent to note that the author anticipated the criticism that the book would receive and has worked in the book, the reasons why books and criticisms should not be banned or suppressed.

The novel raises pertinent and searching questions about religion, liberalism and identity and highlights the importance of unshackling oneself from the bonds of false knowledge.

Aavarana in other languages
The novel was a best seller in Kannada, Gujarati, Tamil and other vernacular languages. In February 2014, Aavarana was translated into English by Sandeep Balakrishna.

Plot summary
Lakshmi, a rebellious, free-spirited and intelligent film-maker, breaks ties with her staunchly Gandhian father to marry Amir, the man she loves. She even agrees reluctantly to Amir's request that she convert to Islam, as a formality and change her name to Razia. However, she is shocked to discover that her husband is not the open-minded, progressive individual he claimed to be. For after marriage, Amir takes his family's side in trying to force her to follow the more rigorous tenets of their faith. This sets her off on a personal journey into India's history to uncover the many layers of religion, caste and creed. Her quest leads her to the many parallels in the narratives between the past and the present and she gradually finds that though much has changed in Indian society over the centuries, much remains the same.

Characters
 Lakshmi alias Razia
 Aameer (Lakshmi's husband)
 Nazeer (Lakshmi's son)
 Narase Gowdru/ Nasrasimhe Gowdru (Lakshmi's father)
 Prof. LN Shastri
 Elizabeth (L N Shastri's wife)
 Digantha  (L N Shastri's son)
 Aruna (L N Shastri's daughter)

Criticism
Aavarana stirred a major controversy in Karnataka. There has been accusations that Bhyrappa is a Hindu fundamentalist who wants to divide society on the basis of history, an allegation which Bhyrappa himself anticipates and tries to refute in the novel. U.R. Ananthamurthy, well known in Kannada literature, has criticised Bhyrappa and his works, terming Aavarana as dangerous. He said that Bhyrappa was a debater who "doesn't know what Hindu religion stands for" and "does not know how to write novels". Kannada Sahitya Parishat president Prof Chandrashekhar Patil has referred to Aavarana as the textbook of Chaddi (a slang for RSS cadres). Booker Prize-winning Indian author Aravind Adiga wrote an article in Outlook 

in which he writes, "the term Aavarana now describes what has happened to S.L. Bhyrappa himself: swallowed by his weakest novel, passed over for the Jnanpith (the traditional crown for the bhasha writer), and in danger of having a fanbase composed entirely of bigots."

Sumana Mukherjee, in her review of the book for Mint, wrote: "Aavarana—originally published in Kannada in 2007—is compelling, even convincing. But it is also self-serving, divisive and short-sighted, if not wilfully blind to the pitfalls of chest-thumping majoritarianism. Propaganda, by nature, is seductive; it feeds into half-baked concepts and beliefs to give them shape and brooks little opposition or questioning. This, perhaps, is Aavarana’s greatest failure as a work of literature: It takes no prisoners, offers no room for dissent or doubt."

S.L. Bhyrappa has reiterated that something was written in his novel. According to the author, the book is the result of his search for true history. He stated: "I have referred to hundreds of history books before writing the novel. However, if anyone has doubts about the facts can refer to the books I have listed in my book. Out of my interest, I have studied history and my findings have resulted in a creative piece of work. I am fed up with debates and discussions on Aavarana. Allow me to think on something else". The novel reiterates "if we don't study history, it repeats".

References

External links 
 Review on the book in oneindia website
 Book review in GoodReads

Kannada novels
2007 Indian novels
Novels by S. L. Bhyrappa